Chasan may refer to:

People 

 Fred Chasan –  American surgeon
 Mark Chasan – American businessman
 Roslyn Chasan – American attorney

Places 

 The Chasan Villa – oceanfront estate in Los Angeles, California that was destroyed by a landslide

Other 

 Chasan (grape) – wine grape variety grown primarily in the Languedoc wine region of southern France
 Chasan (pastry) – traditional Chinese pastry that is popular in the Jiangs province and especially in Huai'an, a historic city which is considered the home of the pastry